The Gooseberry gene, a segment polarity gene, plays an important role in providing genetic information involved with the hedgehog signaling pathway in Drosophila. Thereby, relating to the signaling in wingless development.

References

Drosophila melanogaster genes
Hedgehog signaling pathway